Vandever Mountain is an  mountain summit located in the Sierra Nevada mountain range, in Tulare County of northern California. Vandever Mountain ranks as the 439th highest summit in California. The summit can be reached via  hiking from Farewell Gap or White Chief Canyon.

History
This mountain's name was officially adopted by the United States Board on Geographic Names to honor William Vandever (1817–1893), California congressman from 1887 to 1891 who introduced bills establishing Sequoia, Yosemite, and General Grant National Parks. The name was proposed in the Visalia Delta newspaper on September 4, 1890.

Climate
According to the Köppen climate classification system, Vandever Mountain is located in an alpine climate zone. Most weather fronts originate in the Pacific Ocean, and travel east toward the Sierra Nevada mountains. As fronts approach, they are forced upward by the peaks, causing them to drop their moisture in the form of rain or snowfall onto the range (orographic lift). Precipitation runoff from the mountain drains north into tributaries of Kaweah River, and south into the Little Kern River.

See also

 List of mountain peaks of California

References

External links
 Weather forecast: Vandever Mountain

Mountains of Tulare County, California
Mountains of Sequoia National Park
North American 3000 m summits
Mountains of Northern California
Sierra Nevada (United States)
Sequoia National Forest